Bishop Brady High School is a small, private, Catholic co-educational school in Concord, New Hampshire (Merrimack County).  It is located in the Roman Catholic Diocese of Manchester.  Its official enrollment is 320 students. "A Catholic school, a caring community" is the slogan that adorns the school's sign and is the principle which has guided the school since its founding in 1963. Brady is a four-year college preparatory program.

The school's motto is "fides, caritas, veritas", translated as "faith, charity, and truth".

History
Established in 1963, Bishop Brady offers a college preparatory program in a supportive Christian atmosphere. It replaced St. John's High School, which opened its doors in 1930 on South State Street in Concord. (Saint John's building is still in use as Concord's Catholic K-8 school, Saint John Regional School.)

An expansion and renovation project was completed at Bishop Brady in May 2007, creating a new multimedia center, new guidance suite, six new classrooms, an expanded chapel, and four new administrative offices as well as renovation to the existing administrative area and cafeteria.

The school is named for Matthew F. Brady, a former Bishop of Manchester.

Faculty
Bishop Brady has 41 full-time and 4 part-time faculty members.

Activities
Robotics
The Bishop Brady FIRST Robotics Competition Team, Number 1517:

2007 Bishop Brady started the first Safety Man mascot with then junior, Michael Steenbeke. The Safety Man has now become an integral part of the FIRST Robotics competitions.

Athletics

Brady fields sports teams in NHIAA Division I, II, III, and IV, and has cross country, track and field, football, lacrosse, baseball/softball, field hockey, ice hockey, basketball, skiing and soccer programs.

While apart of Division V, the football team became state champions twice in a row. The team is currently in Division IV and plays their home games at Memorial Field in Concord.  The coach of the Giants is Jermaine McKenzie.

Bishop Brady was a New Hampshire high school football power in the late 1970s and early 1980s, winning the Division III state championship in 1978, 1979, 1981, 1983, and 1984.

Bishop Brady girls' skiing won the 2008–09 state championship, with one Brady athlete, Stephanie Siegart, finishing first overall in the slalom event, with run times of 34.51 and 34.82.  All six Brady entrants finished in the top 20 in slalom, and in the top 22 in the giant slalom.

Brady's athletic mascot is the Green Giants.  The name was chosen by students in the early days of the school as a reference to the song "The Jolly Green Giant" by The Kingsmen, and not the brand of vegetable.

Bishop Brady girls' and boys' skiing won the 2014–15 state championship.

References

External links
BBHS official site

Roman Catholic Diocese of Manchester
Catholic secondary schools in New Hampshire
Schools in Concord, New Hampshire
Educational institutions established in 1963
1963 establishments in New Hampshire